Rickenbacher is a surname. Notable people with the surname include:

 Karl Anton Rickenbacher, Swiss orchestra conductor
 Eddie Rickenbacker (originally Rickenbacher), World War I flying ace, head of Eastern Airlines
 Adolph Rickenbacker (originally Rickenbacher), co-founder of the Rickenbacker guitar company, cousin of Eddie Rickenbacker

See also
 Rickenbacker (disambiguation)